The worldwide network of Scientology organizations consists of numerous entities and corporations, located in the United States as well as in other countries. All these organizations are interrelated and connected through an internal hierarchy system, which is called the "Command Channels of Scientology".

At the top of the "Command Channels" are management corporations, such as the Religious Technology Center, the Church of Spiritual Technology, or the Church of Scientology International, who own and license the Scientology trademarks and service marks to other entities and corporations within the internal hierarchy system of the network.

Within the sphere of the upper Scientology management there are also several corporations with specific functions with regard to publication, distribution, administration, and finances. Examples are the Scientology-owned publishing house Bridge Publications or the World Institute of Scientology Enterprises, which promotes and sells Scientology services to businesses and entrepreneurs.

Below the Scientology management are Scientology service organizations ("Churches"), who deliver Scientology services to its members, and so-called secular Scientology organization, who seek to introduce the overall "technology" of the organization's founder L. Ron Hubbard in various parts of today's society. Examples are the Florida-based service organization Church of Scientology Flag Service Organization, Inc., the German "Scientology Kirche Hannover e.V.", or local chapters of the Citizens Commission on Human Rights, an organization that seeks to abolish any form of psychiatry. Most of the Scientology organizations in a geographical area, secular or otherwise, are members of the Clear Expansion Committee, with the goal of clearing the entire community and establishing a Scientology world.

In a response to questions by the Internal Revenue Service (IRS) with regards  to its application for tax exemption under section 501(c)3) of the Internal Revenue Code, the Church of Scientology International provided to the IRS a list of Scientology corporations and entities, categorized by their functions and activities.

Management organizations

Principal organizations
Church of Scientology
Religious Technology Center (RTC)
Church of Spiritual Technology (CST)
Church of Scientology International (CSI)

Trademark service organizations
Inspector General Network (IGN)
IGN International AB
Dianetics Centers International (DCI)
Dianetics Foundation International (DFI)
Hubbard Dianetics Foundation (HDF)
WISE, Inc.

Financial trusts
Author's Family Trust
Church of Scientology Religious Trust (CSRT)
Scientology International Reserves Trust (SIRT)
Trust for Scientologists
United States Parishioners Trust
Flag Ship Trust (FST)
International Publications Trust
Scientology Defense Trust

Financial service organizations
SOR Services Ltd.
Nesta Investments Ltd.
FSO Oklahoma Investments Corporation
Theta Management Ltd. (TML)

Publishing houses and organizations
Author Services Inc. (ASI)
Bridge Publications Inc. (BPI)
Golden Era Productions
New Era Publications ApS
Scientology Publications Ltd.

Secular and social management entities
Association for Better Living and Education (ABLE)
Applied Scholastics
Citizens Commission on Human Rights (CCHR)
Criminon International
Narconon International
The Way to Happiness Foundation International
World Institute of Scientology Enterprises (WISE)

Other management organizations
Church of Scientology Celebrity Centre International (CC Int.)
International Hubbard Ecclesiastical League of Pastors (IHELP)
Scientology Missions International (SMI)

The Sea Org is an unincorporated management organization.

Service organizations
Church of Scientology Flag Service Organization
Church of Scientology Flag Ship Service Organization
Church of Scientology Western United States
Church of Scientology Advanced Organization Saint Hill Europe & Africa
Church of Scientology Religious Education College, Inc.
Church of Scientology, Inc.

Membership organizations
Unincorporated associations
International Association of Scientologists (IAS)
Hubbard Association of Scientologists International (HASI)

Membership service organizations
International Association of Scientologists Administrations, N.V. (IASA)
Membership Services Administrations (UK) Ltd. (MSA)
Cohn International Association (CIA)

Media organizations
The Scientology Media Productions
 Scientology TV Network

See also
L. Ron Hubbard
Scientology
Dianetics

References

Lists of organizations